During World War II, Nazi Germany engaged in a policy of deliberate maltreatment of Soviet prisoners of war (POWs), in contrast to their general treatment of British and American POWs. This policy, which amounted to deliberately starving and working to death Soviet POWs, the bulk of whom were Slavs, was grounded in Nazi racial theory, which depicted Slavs as sub-humans (Untermenschen). The policy resulted in some 3.3 to 3.5 million deaths.

During Operation Barbarossa, the Axis invasion of the Soviet Union, and the subsequent German–Soviet War, millions of Red Army (and other Soviet Armed Forces) prisoners of war were taken. Many were executed arbitrarily in the field by the German forces or handed over to the SS to be shot, under the Commissar Order. Most, however, died during the death marches from the front lines or under inhumane conditions in German prisoner-of-war camps and concentration camps.

Death toll

It is estimated that at least 3.3 million Soviet POWs died in Nazi custody, out of 5.7 million. This figure represents a total of 57% of all Soviet POWs and it may be contrasted with 8,300 out of 231,000 British and U.S. prisoners, or 3.6%. About 5% of the Soviet prisoners who died were Jews. The most deaths took place between June 1941 and January 1942, when the Germans killed an estimated 2.8 million Soviet POWs primarily through deliberate starvation, exposure, and summary execution. A million at most had been released, most of whom were so-called 'volunteers' (Hilfswillige) for (often compulsory) auxiliary service in the Wehrmacht, 500,000 had fled or were liberated, the remaining 3.3 million had perished as POWs.

The figure of 3.3 million POW dead is based on German figures and analysis. Data published in Russia presents a different view of Soviet POW dead. Viktor Zemskov estimated Soviet POW deaths at 2.3 million; he published statistics that put Soviet POW losses at 2,471,000 (5,734,000 were captured, 821,000 were released for German military service, 72,000 escaped and 2,371,000 liberated ). Of the 823,000 POWS released for service in the German military forces 212,400 were killed or missing, 436,600 were returned to the USSR and imprisoned and 180,000 remained in western countries after the war.   Russian military historian Grigori F. Krivosheev maintained POW and MIA losses of the combat forces were actually 1.783 million, according to Krivosheev the higher figures of dead includes reservists not on active strength, civilians and military personnel who were captured during the course of the war.

By September 1941, the mortality rate among Soviet POWs was in the order of 1% per day. According to the United States Holocaust Memorial Museum (USHMM), by the winter of 1941, "starvation and disease resulted in mass death of unimaginable proportions". This deliberate starvation, despite food being available, led many desperate prisoners to resort to acts of cannibalism, was Nazi policy, and was all in accordance with the Hunger Plan developed by the Reich Minister of Food Herbert Backe. For the Germans, Soviet POWs were expendable: they consumed calories needed by others and, unlike Western POWs, were considered to be subhuman.

Commissar Order

The Commissar Order (German: Kommissarbefehl) was a written order given by the German High Command (OKW) on 6 June 1941, prior to the beginning of Operation Barbarossa (German invasion of the Soviet Union). It demanded that any Soviet political commissar identified among captured troops be shot immediately. Those prisoners who could be identified as "thoroughly bolshevized or as active representatives of the Bolshevist ideology" were also to be executed.

General internment system for Soviet prisoners of war

In the summer and autumn of 1941, vast numbers of Soviet prisoners were captured in about a dozen large encirclements. Due to their rapid advance into the Soviet Union and an anticipated quick victory, the Germans did not want to ship these prisoners to Germany. Under the administration of the Wehrmacht, the prisoners were processed, guarded, forced-marched, or transported in open rail cars to locations mostly in the occupied Soviet Union, Germany, and occupied Poland. Much like comparable events, such as the Pacific War's Bataan Death March in 1942, the treatment of prisoners was brutal, without much in the way of supporting logistics.

Soviet prisoners of war were stripped of their supplies and clothing by poorly-equipped German troops when the cold weather set in; this resulted in death for the prisoners. Most of the camps for Soviet POWs were simply open areas fenced off with barbed wire and watchtowers with no inmate housing. These meager conditions forced the crowded prisoners to live in holes they had dug for themselves, which were exposed to the elements. Beatings and other abuse by the guards were common, and prisoners were malnourished, often consuming only a few hundred kilocalories or less per day. Medical treatment was non-existent and an International Red Cross offer to help in 1941 was rejected by Hitler. The Soviet government ignored offers of help from the International Red Cross as well as prisoner exchanges from the Axis forces.<ref>Robert Coalson, Dmitry Volchek. 'Do Not Respond': Did The Soviet Government Abandon Its WWII Prisoners?. Radio Free Europe/Radio Liberty. 9 May 2018</ref>

Some of the Soviet POWs were also experimented on. In one such case, Dr. Heinrich Berning from Hamburg University starved prisoners to death as "famine experiments". In another instance, a group of prisoners at Zhitomir were shot using dum-dum bullets.

Prisoner-of-war camps
The camps established especially for Soviet POWs were called Russenlager ("Russian camp"). The Allied regulars kept by Germany were usually treated in accordance with the 1929 Geneva Convention on Prisoners of War. Although the Soviet Union was not a signatory, Germany was, and Article 82 of the Convention required signatories to treat all captured enemy soldiers "as between the belligerents who are parties thereto". Russenlager conditions were often even worse than those commonly experienced by prisoners in regular concentration camps. Such camps included:

Oflag IV-C: Allied officers from Western countries at Colditz Castle were forbidden to share Red Cross packages with starving Soviet prisoners.
Oflag XIII-D: In July 1941 a new compound was set up in Oflag XIII-A for higher ranking Soviet military officers captured during Operation Barbarossa. It was closed in April 1942 and the surviving officers (many had died during the winter due to an epidemic) were transferred to other camps.
Stalag 324: 28,444 Soviet POWs were held at this camp near Grady
Stalag 328: 41,012 Soviet POWs were held at this camp near Lviv
Stalag 350/Z: According to a 1944 Soviet report, 43,000 captured Red Army personnel were either killed or died from diseases and starvation at this camp near Riga. The prisoners were used for the construction of Salaspils concentration camp in October 1941.
Stalag 359: An epidemic of dysentery led to the execution of some 6,000 Red Army prisoners between 21–28 September 1941 (3,261 of them on the first day), conducted by the Police Battalion 306 of the Ordnungspolizei. By mid-1942, about 20,000 Soviet POWs had perished there from hunger, disease and executions. The camp was then redesignated as the Poniatowa concentration camp for Jews (the main site of the Operation Harvest Festival massacre in 1943).
Stalag I-B: Tens of thousands of prisoners died in the camp, the vast majority of them Soviets.
Stalag II-B: The construction of the second camp, Lager-Ost, started in June 1941 to accommodate the huge numbers of Soviet prisoners taken in Operation Barbarossa. In November 1941 a typhoid fever epidemic broke out in the Lager-Ost which went on until March 1942. A total of 38,383 Soviet POWs were held Stalag II B.
Stalag III-A: Mortality rates of Soviet prisoners were extremely high compared to the POWs of other nations, including around 2,000-2,500 Soviets who died in a typhus outbreak during the winter of 1941-42. While non-Soviet prisoners were buried with military honours in individual graves at the camp cemetery, Soviet dead were buried anonymously in mass graves.
Stalag III-C: When Soviet prisoners captured during Operation Barbarossa arrived in July 1941 they were held in separate zones and suffered severe conditions and disease. The majority of these prisoners (up to 12,000) were killed, starved to death or died from disease.
Stalag IV-A: In June–September 1941 Soviet prisoners from Operation Barbarossa were placed in another camp. Conditions were appalling, and starvation, epidemics and ill-treatment took a heavy toll of lives; the dead Soviet prisoners were buried in mass graves.
Stalag IV-B: In July 1941 about 11,000 Soviet soldiers, and some officers, arrived. By April 1942 only 3,279 remained; the rest had died from malnutrition and a typhus epidemic caused by the deplorable sanitary conditions. Their bodies were buried in mass graves. After April 1942 more Soviet prisoners arrived and died just as rapidly. At the end of 1942, 10,000 reasonably healthy Soviet prisoners were transferred to work in Belgian coal mines; the rest, suffering from tuberculosis, continued to die at the rate of 10–20 per day.
Stalag IV-H (Stalag 304): In 1942 at least 1,000 prisoners were "weeded-out" by the Gestapo and shot.
Stalag V-A: During 1941–1942 many Soviet POWs arrived but they were kept in separate enclosures and received much harsher treatment than the other prisoners. Thousands of them died of malnutrition and disease.
Stalag VI-C: Over 2,000 Soviet prisoners from Operation Barbarossa arrived in the summer of 1941. Conditions were appalling and starvation, epidemics and ill-treatment took a heavy toll of lives. The dead were buried in mass graves.
Stalag VI-K (Stalag 326): Between 40,000 and 60,000 prisoners died, mostly buried in three mass graves. A Soviet war cemetery is still in existence, containing about 200 named graves.
Stalag VII-A: During five years about 1,000 prisoners died at the camp, over 800 of them Soviets (mostly officers). At the end of the war there were still 27 Soviet Army generals in the camp who had survived the mistreatment that they, like all Soviet prisoners, had been subjected to. The new prisoners were inspected upon arrival by local Munich Gestapo agents; some 484 were found to be "undesirable" and immediately sent to concentration camps and murdered.
Stalag VIII-C: 29,436 prisoners were held at this camp. Conditions were appalling and starvation, epidemics and ill-treatment took a heavy toll of lives. By early 1942 the survivors had been transferred to other camps.
Stalag VIII-E (Stalag VIII-C/Z): The first Soviets arrived in July 1941. A total of 57,545 Soviet POWs were held at the camp.
Stalag VIII-F (Stalag 318 / Stalag 344): 108,471 Soviet POWs were held at this camp near Lamsdorf.
Stalag X-B
Stalag XI-D (Stalag 321): In July 1941, over 10,000 Soviet army officers were imprisoned in a new sub-camp of Stalag XI-B. Thousands of them died in the winter of 1941-42 as the result of a typhoid fever epidemic. 
Stalag XI-C: In July 1941, about 20,000 Soviet prisoners captured during Operation Barbarossa arrived; they were housed in the open while huts were being built. Some 14,000 POWs died during the winter of 1941–42. In late 1943 the POW camp was closed and the entire facility became Bergen-Belsen concentration camp.

"Weeding-out" program
In the "weeding-out actions" (Aussonderungsaktionen) of 1941–42, the Gestapo further identified Communist Party and state officials, commissars, academic scholars, Jews and other "undesirable" or "dangerous" individuals who had survived the Commissar Order selections, and transferred them to concentration camps, where they were summarily executed. At Stalag VII-A at Moosburg, Major Karl Meinel objected to these executions, but the SS (including Karl von Eberstein) intervened, Meinel was demoted to reserve, and the killing continued.International Military Tribunal at Nurnberg (circa 1947). Nazi Conspiracy and Aggression. USGPO.

In all, between June 1941 and May 1944 about 10% of all Soviet POWs were turned over to the SS-Totenkopfverbände concentration camp organization or the Einsatzgruppen death squads and murdered. Einsatzgruppen killings included the Babi Yar massacres where Soviet POWs were among 70,000–120,000 people executed between 1941 and 1943 and the Ponary massacre that included the execution of some 7,500 Soviet POWs in 1941 (among about 100,000 murdered there between 1941 and 1944). 

Soviet prisoners of war in German concentration and extermination camps

Between 140,000 and 500,000 Soviet prisoners of war died or were executed in Nazi concentration camps. Most of those executed were killed by shooting, though some were gassed.

Auschwitz-Birkenau concentration camp: about 15,000 Soviet POWs who were brought to Auschwitz I for work, only 92 remained alive at the last roll call. About 3,000 more were killed by being shot or gassed immediately after arriving. Out of the first 10,000 brought to work in 1941, 9,000 died in the first five months. A group of about 600 Soviet prisoners were gassed in the first Zyklon-B experiments on 3 September 1941; in December 1941, a further 900 Soviet POWs were murdered by means of gas. In March 1941, the SS chief Heinrich Himmler ordered the construction of a large camp for 100,000 Soviet POWs at Birkenau, in close proximity to the main camp. Most of the Soviet prisoners were dead by the time Birkenau was reclassified as the Auschwitz II concentration camp in March 1942.
Buchenwald concentration camp: 8,483 Soviet POWs were selected in 1941–1942 by three Dresden Gestapo officers and sent to the camp for immediate murder by a gunshot to the back of the neck, the infamous Genickschuss using a purpose-built facility.
Chełmno extermination camp: The victims murdered at the Chełmno killing centre included several hundred Poles and Soviet POWs.
Dachau concentration camp: Over 4,000 Soviet POWs were executed by a firing squad at Hebertshausen Shooting Range near Dachau. As of June 2020, only 816 names of those murdered in Dachau are known to public.
Flossenbürg concentration camp: More than 1,000 Soviet POWs had been executed in Flossenbürg by the end of 1941; executions continued sporadically up to 1944. The POWs at one of the sub-camps staged a failed uprising and mass escape attempt on 1 May 1944. The SS also established a special camp for 2,000 Soviet POWs within Flossenbürg itself. 
Gross-Rosen concentration camp: 65,000 Soviet POWs were killed by feeding them only a thin soup of grass, water, and salt for six months. In October 1941 the SS transferred about 3,000 Soviet POWs to Gross-Rosen for execution by shooting.
Hinzert concentration camp: A group of 70 POWs were told that they would undergo a medical examination, but instead were injected with potassium cyanide, a deadly poison.
Majdanek concentration camp: The first transport directed toward Majdanek consisted of 5,000 Soviet POWs arriving in the latter half of 1941, they soon died of starvation and exposure. Executions were also conducted there by the shooting of prisoners in trenches. A total of 86 of the few 127 prisoners still remaining the following year attempted a mass escape on 14 July 1942, 84 successfully rushed a lightly defended section of fence and escaped into the woods and evaded recapture. In retaliation the 41 Soviet POWs who did not participate were summarily executed.
Mauthausen-Gusen concentration camp: Following the outbreak of the Soviet–German War the camps started to receive a large number of Soviet POWs; most of them were kept in huts separated from the rest of the camp. Soviet POWs were a major part of the first groups to be gassed in the newly built gas chamber in early 1942; at least 2,843 of them were murdered in the camp. According to the USHMM, "so many POWs were shot that the local population complained that their water supply had been contaminated. The rivers and streams near the camp ran red with blood."
Neuengamme concentration camp: According to the testimony of Wilhelm Bahr, an ex-medical orderly, during the trial against Bruno Tesch, 200 Soviet POWs were gassed by prussic acid in 1942.
Sachsenhausen concentration camp: Soviet POWs were victims of the largest part of the executions that took place. Thousands of them were murdered immediately after arriving at the camp, including 9,090 executed between 31 August and 2 October 1941. Among those who died there was Lt. Yakov Dzhugashvili, the elder son of Joseph Stalin (either by suicide or shot). 
Sobibór extermination camp: Soviet POWs of Jewish ethnicity were among hundreds of thousands people gassed at Sobibór. A group of captive Soviet officers led by 2nd Lt. Alexander Pechersky organized a successful mass breakout from Sobibor, after which the SS closed and dismantled the camp.

Soviet prisoners of war in German slave labour system

In January 1942, Hitler authorized better treatment of Soviet POWs because the war had bogged down, and German leaders decided to use prisoners for forced labour on a large scale. Their number increased from barely 150,000 in 1942, to the peak of 631,000 in the summer of 1944. Many were dispatched to the coal mines (between 1 July and 10 November 1943, 27,638 Soviet POWs died in the Ruhr Area alone), while others were sent to Krupp, Daimler-Benz or other companies, where they provided labour while often being slowly worked to death. The largest "employers" of 1944 were mining (160,000), agriculture (138,000) and the metal industry (131,000). No less than 200,000 prisoners died during forced labour.

The Organisation Todt was a civil and military engineering group in Germany eponymously named for its founder Fritz Todt. The organisation was responsible for a wide range of engineering projects both in pre-World War II Germany, and in Germany itself and occupied territories from France to the Soviet Union during the war, and became notorious for using forced labour. Most of the so-called "volunteer" Soviet POW workers were consumed by the Organisation Todt. The period from 1942 until the end of the war had approximately 1.4 million labourers in the service of the Organisation Todt. Overall, 1% were Germans rejected from military service and 1.5% were concentration camp prisoners; the rest were prisoners of war and compulsory labourers from occupied countries. All non-Germans were effectively treated as slaves and many did not survive the work or the war.

 Repatriation and after the war 
Even during the war, servicemen who had escaped from the encirclement and who crossed the front line from among the civilian population, after filtration, were sent mainly to replenish the rear units, in particular labor armies. These armies built military-industrial facilities, in particular the Kuibyshev Aviation Plant, etc.

To check "former Red Army servicemen who were in captivity and surrounded by the enemy," a network of testing and filtration camps was created by the decree of the State Defense Committee of 27 December 1941. In 1942, in addition to the previously existing Yuzhsky special camp, 22 more camps were created in the Vologda, Tambov, Ryazan, Kursk, Voronezh and other regions. In practice, these special camps were military high security prisons, and for prisoners, who in the overwhelming majority did not commit any crimes.

In 1944, the flow of prisoners of war and repatriated returning to the Soviet Union increased sharply. In the summer of this year, a new system of filtering and screening by the state security authorities of all returnees was developed and then introduced.

In the spring and summer of 1945, a large number of repatriates accumulated at check-filtration and collection-transfer points in Germany and other European countries, several times exceeding the throughput of these points.

The Soviet and Russian military historian G.F.Krivosheev indicates the following figures based on the data of the NKVD: out of 1,836,562 soldiers who returned home from captivity, 233,400 people were convicted in connection with the accusation of cooperation with the enemy and were serving sentences in the GULAG system. Most of them were released quickly after routine processing.

During the war, servicemen released from captivity in most cases, after a short check, were restored to military service, moreover, enlisted and non-commissioned personnel mainly in ordinary military units, and officers, as a rule, were deprived of their officer ranks, and from them officer assault (penalty) battalions were formed ... In the post-war period, the released officers were sent to the NKVD camps and spare parts of the Red Army Glavupraform for a more thorough check.

After the war, the privates and sergeants released from captivity, who did not serve in the German army or traitorous formations, were divided into two large groups according to age - demobilized and non-demobilized age. In 1945, after the dismissal from the army to the reserve of the Red Army men of those ages who were subject to the demobilization order, ordinary and non-commissioned prisoners of war of the corresponding ages were also released to their homes. Prisoners of war of the rank and file and non-demobilized ages, in accordance with a special decree of the State Defense Committee of 18 August 1945, were sent to workers' battalions to work in industry and restore facilities destroyed during the war.

By the directive of the General Staff of the Armed Forces of the USSR of 12 July 1946, the workers' battalions were disbanded, and the term "transferred to permanent cadres of industry" was applied to those enrolled in them. They had no right to change jobs and return to their homeland even after their peers were demobilized from the army.

In 1956, a massive review of the cases of convicted former prisoners of war took place. At the initiative of Georgy Zhukov, Minister of Justice Konstantin Gorshenin and Attorney General Roman Rudenko issued a joint decree of the Central Committee of the CPSU and the USSR Council of Ministers on 29 June 1956 "On elimination of the consequences of gross violations of the law in respect of former prisoners of war and their families". After that, prosecutorial protests began to be introduced against the sentences to Soviet prisoners of war. As a result of consideration of the protests of the military prosecutor's office made in the second half of 1956, the courts terminated cases with full rehabilitation against 253 convicts, and another 13 convicts changed their sentences with retraining. For example, on 11 December 1956, the plenum of the USSR Supreme Court terminated the criminal case against the former prisoner of war P. Okhotin - for lack of corpus delicti. When the case was reconsidered, it turned out that Okhotin, who performed the duties of a cook in a German camp, became the victim of a slander in beating prisoners of war who disturbed the order in the kitchen (because of this slander, on 16 July 1948, he was sentenced by the tribunal of the Leningrad Military District to 25 years in forced labor camps). On 20 September 1956, a decree of the Presidium of the USSR Supreme Soviet extended the amnesty decree of 17 September 1955 to former Soviet servicemen convicted of aiding the enemy. For former prisoners of war, the punishment was reduced to actually served and they were subject to release. The cases of the deceased former prisoners of war were not checked.

See also

Prisoner of war
Soviet repressions against former prisoners of war
German war crimes
War crimes of the Wehrmacht
Myth of the clean Wehrmacht
Commissar Order
Rusthof cemetery
Severity Order
Operation Zeppelin (espionage plan)

References

Literature
 Bloodlands: Europe Between Hitler and Stalin by Timothy SnyderKeine Kameraden: Die Wehrmacht und die Sowjetischen Kriegsgefangenen, 1941–1945 by Christian StreitThe Policies of Genocide: Jews and Soviet Prisoners of War in Nazi Germany'' by Gerhard Hirschfeld and Wolfgang J. Mommsen

External links

Nazi persecution of Soviet Prisoners of War at the Holocaust Encyclopedia
Images tagged with "Soviet POW" from Yad Vashem
Sowjetische Kriegsgefangene 
Testimonies concerning Soviet POWs in German captivity - 'Chronicles of Terror' collection

POW
POW
The Holocaust
Anti-Russian sentiment
Soviet prisoners of war
Soviet casualties of World War II
Soviet
Nazi war crimes in Russia